The 2020 Football Championship of Chernivtsi Oblast was won by USC Dovbush Chernivtsi.

League table

References

Football
Chernivtsi
Chernivtsi